Pedro Gómez Malaver (also Pedro Gómez Maraver) (died 28 December 1551) was a Roman Catholic prelate who served as the first Bishop of Guadalajara (1548–1551).

Biography
On 13 July 1548 Pedro Gómez Malaver was appointed by the King of Spain and confirmed by Pope Paul III as the first Bishop of Guadalajara. On 7 March 1550 he was consecrated bishop by Martín Sarmiento de Osacastro, Bishop of Tlaxcala. He served as Bishop of Guadalajara until his death on 28 December 1551.

References

External links and additional sources
 (for Chronology of Bishops)
 (for Chronology of Bishops)

1551 deaths
Bishops appointed by Pope Paul III
16th-century Roman Catholic bishops in Mexico